Barbaros (also known as Barbaras) is a former village in the Makedonski Brod Municipality, in the area of Poreče, near the town of Makedonski Brod. The village no longer exists, and only remnants of it remain.

The village was located near the locality Barbaros, at the eponymous pass on the road Makedonski Brod-Prilep, at the crossing from Porečе to Prilep Plain.

History
In the 19th century, Barbaros was a village in the nahiyah of Poreče of the kaza of Kičevo of the Ottoman Empire.

Demographics
The "Ethnography of Adrianople, Monastir and Thessalonica" states that in 1873 the village had 6 households with 25 Bulgarian Exarchists.

Landmarks and sights
In the outskirts of the village, there is archaeological site of a Medieval settlement and a castel called Kula (lit. Tower).

Gallery

See also
Makedonski Brod Municipality
Poreče

References

External links 

 Barbaros on Google Maps

Villages in Makedonski Brod Municipality